Aldo Nardi (3 March 1931 – 11 July 2001) was an Italian professional football player.

He played for 6 seasons (80 games, 1 goal) in the Serie A for A.S. Roma, A.C. Torino and U.S. Alessandria Calcio 1912.

References

1931 births
2001 deaths
Italian footballers
Serie A players
A.S. Roma players
Empoli F.C. players
Torino F.C. players
U.S. Alessandria Calcio 1912 players
F.C. Grosseto S.S.D. players
Association football defenders